Vovin (in Enochian VOVIN, VOVINA means dragon) is the seventh full-length musical album by symphonic metal band Therion. It is their bestselling album, selling over 150,000 copies in Europe alone.
Even though it was released under the name Therion, Christofer Johnsson regards this as his solo album, as it was recorded entirely with studio musicians who were not members of the band.

Track listing

Credits
Christofer Johnsson - guitar, keyboards

Guest artists
Tommy Eriksson - guitar
Wolf Simon - drums
Jan Kazda - bass guitar, additional arrangements, orchestra and choir conducting
Waldemar Sorychta - additional guitars
Siegfried Bemm - additionals guitars, production, mixing, mastering
Lorentz Aspen - Hammond organ ("Draconian Trilogy")
Ralf Scheepers - lead vocals ("The Wild Hunt")
Martina Astner - solo and duet alto and soprano vocals
Sarah Jezebel Deva - solo and duet alto and soprano vocals

Choir
Eileen Küpper - soprano
Angelica Märtz - soprano
Dorothea Fischer - alto
Anne Tributh - alto
Gregor Dippel - tenor
Max Cilotek - tenor
Javier Zapater - bass
Jochen Bauer - bass

Indigo Orchestra
Orchestration was made by Indigo Orchestra:
Petra Stalz - violin
Heike Haushalter - violin
Monika Maltek - viola
Gesa Hangen - cello
Alois Kott - double bass, contrabass

Single
"Eye of Shiva"

Notes
 Bonus track

Charts

References

External links
Vovin at Therion's official website

 (with bonus track)

1998 albums
Nuclear Blast albums
Therion (band) albums